The Birds II: Land's End is a 1994 American made-for-television horror film directed by Rick Rosenthal, credited to Alan Smithee. The film is a standalone sequel to the 1963 film The Birds, directed by Alfred Hitchcock, and stars Brad Johnson, Chelsea Field, and James Naughton. Tippi Hedren, who starred in The Birds, appears in a minor role different from the one she played in the original film. The original music score was composed by Ron Ramin.

The Birds II: Land's End premiered on Showtime on March 14, 1994. Featuring a similar plot to the original film, a biology teacher and Somali Civil War veteran named Ted moves with his wife and daughters to a summer house on an island after the death of their son. Soon after they arrive, flocks of birds start attacking and killing people for no apparent reason.

Plot
Ted and Mary Hocken move to a remote, windswept, tiny East Coast island with their two young daughters. The Hockens are determined to forget losing their son and spend a quiet, uneventful summer.

An immense flock of birds begins massing around the small town of Gull Island. A marine biologist is the target of a mysterious, grisly attack. Before long, the sky is darkened by a hideous onslaught of screeching birds. An old timer recalls a similar, horrific outbreak three decades ago in Bodega Bay, California.

Cast
 Brad Johnson as Ted Hocken
 Chelsea Field as Mary Hocken
 James Naughton as Frank Irvin
 Jan Rubes as Karl
 Tippi Hedren as Helen
 Stephanie Milford as Jill 
 Megan Gallacher as Joanna
 Richard K. Olsen as Doc Rayburn

Tippi Hedren, who starred as Melanie Daniels in the original film, returned in a supporting role as a different character named Helen. Hedren was disappointed that she did not have a larger part: "I wish that it was more than a cameo. I think they made a mistake by not doing that. But it has helped me to feed my lions and tigers". When asked about what could have been Hitchcock's opinion, she answered: "I'd hate to think what he would say!"

Reception
The television film received negative reviews. Ken Tucker of Entertainment Weekly slated the production, especially criticizing the writing and acting: "The actors in Birds II have little to do except widen their eyes in terror, and even that seems a daunting stretch for Johnson". He also commented on the fact that it was an Alan Smithee film, the pseudonym used when a director wants to disown the final film.

In a 2002 interview, Hedren described the film as a horrible experience.

Home video
The Birds II: Land's End was released on VHS and LaserDisc in the United States in 1994 by MCA/Universal Home Video and reissued on VHS in 1997 via GoodTimes Home Video.

The film was released on Blu-ray from Vinegar Syndrome, featuring a new 2K restoration. It was made available on August 30, 2022.

References

External links

 
 
 

1994 films
1994 horror films
1990s American films
1990s English-language films
American horror television films
American natural horror films
American sequel films
Films based on works by Daphne du Maurier
Films credited to Alan Smithee
Films directed by Rick Rosenthal
Films shot in North Carolina
Horror films about birds
Showtime (TV network) films
Television films based on short fiction
Television sequel films